Le Point is a French weekly political and news magazine published in Paris.

History and profile
Le Point was founded in September 1972 by a group of journalists who had, one year earlier, left the editorial team of L'Express, which was then owned by Jean-Jacques Servan-Schreiber, a député (member of parliament) of the Parti Radical, a centrist party.

The company operating Le Point, Société d'exploitation de l'hebdomadaire Le Point (SEBDO Le Point) has its head office in the 14th arrondissement of Paris. The founders emphasize on readers' need and it became the aim of Le Point which is published weekly on Thursdays by Le Point Communication.

After a fairly difficult start in September 1972, the magazine quickly challenged L'Express. The editorial team of spring 1972 found financial backing with group Hachette and was then directed by Claude Imbert. Other journalists making up the team were: Jacques Duquesne, Henri Trinchet, Pierre Billard, Robert Franc, Georges Suffert. The management included Olivier Chevrillon, Pdg and Philippe Ramond. It has changed ownership several times. Gaumont cinema group bought the magazine in 1981. In 1997 the magazine was acquired by its current owner Artémis, a French investment group founded and owned by the billionaire businessman François Pinault. In 2001 the logo and layout of Le Point was changed. The weekly recruited journalists from the Parisian press and relied on its ability to redefine the genre. It modeled itself closely on Time Magazine and Newsweek.

Le Point has a conservative, center-right stance without any political affiliation. It publishes a list regarding the reputation of companies, Baromètre d’Image des Grandes Entreprises.

Circulation

Le Point had a circulation of 336,000 copies in 1981. It was 311,000 copies in 1987 and 320,000 copies in 1988.

In 2001 Le Point had a circulation of 303,000 copies. During the 2007-2008 period its circulation was 419,000 copies. In 2009 the circulation of the magazine was 435,000 copies. Its circulation in 2011 was 428,114 copies. The 2013 circulation of the magazine was 417,062 copies. The 2020 circulation of the magazine was 288,361 copies.

See also 

Le Nouvel Observateur – general information French newsmagazine
L'Express – conservative newsmagazine, owned by Belgian group Roularta
Valeurs Actuelles

References

External links 
 Le Point website 

1972 establishments in France
Conservatism in France
Conservative magazines
French-language magazines
News magazines published in France
French news websites
Political magazines published in France
Weekly magazines published in France
Magazines established in 1972
Magazines published in Paris